A list of films produced in France in 1915.

See also
 1915 in France

External links
 French films of 1915 at the Internet Movie Database

1915
Lists of 1915 films by country or language
Films